USS Fresno has been the name of three ships in the United States Navy.  All were named for the city of Fresno, California.

  was a cargo ship acquired by the Navy in 1918 and transferred to the United States Shipping Board in 1919.
  was an Atlanta-class light cruiser launched on 5 March 1946 and decommissioned in 1949.
  was a Newport-class tank landing ship which served from 1969 until 1993.

Fresno, USS